The 2015 Finnish Figure Skating Championships took place between December 19 and 21, 2014 at the Trio Areena in Vantaa. Skaters competed in the disciplines of men's singles, ladies' singles, and ice dancing on the senior and junior levels. The results were one of the criteria used to choose the Finnish teams to the 2015 World Championships, 2015 European Championships, and 2015 World Junior Championships.

Senior results

Men

Ladies

Ice dance

External links
 2015 Finnish Championships results
 info

Finnish Figure Skating Championships
Finnish Figure Skating Championships, 2015
2014 in figure skating
2014 in Finnish sport
Finnish Figure Skating Championships, 2015